Sterling R. Brown (born c. 1938) is a former American football coach and college athletics administrator. He served as the head football coach at Drexel University in Philadelphia, Pennsylvania from 1969 to 1973 and Ursinus College in Collegeville, Pennsylvania from 1982 to 1987, compiling a career college football coaching record of 38–56–2. Brown was last head coach in the history of the Drexel Dragons football program.

Brown graduated from East Stroudsburg University of Pennsylvania in 1961.

Head coaching record

References

1930s births
Year of birth missing (living people)
Living people
American football guards
Drexel Dragons football coaches
East Stroudsburg Warriors football players
Hofstra Pride football coaches
Navy Midshipmen football coaches
Penn Quakers football coaches
Temple Owls football coaches
Ursinus Bears football coaches
Villanova Wildcats football coaches
Virginia Cavaliers football coaches
Wyoming Cowboys football coaches
High school football coaches in New York (state)
People from Hanover, Pennsylvania
Players of American football from Pennsylvania